Kenardington is a small clustered village and the centre of a relatively small rural civil parish of the same name, in the Ashford District of Kent, England.

Geography
Kenardington is on the edge of Romney Marsh, which its church of St Mary (with its tower dated 1170 AD) overlooks from a hilltop. The site of the church was once the scene of a battle, being stormed by the Danes in the 10th century and it stands on the site of what seems to have been a small Saxon fort, the remains of its earthworks now largely ploughed out of sight in fields used as arable land.

Amenities and long distance tour routes
Kenardington had a village shop/post office until a date in the 1980s since which the nearest shops and railway station are in Hamstreet approximately two miles away.  The south-west of the parish is a wooded public park and has picnic areas.

The Saxon Shore Way and Royal Military Canal pass through.

References

External links

 Village website
 Notes on facilities, history
 Statistical civil parish overview - map

Villages in Kent
Villages in the Borough of Ashford
Civil parishes in Ashford, Kent